Wim Feys (born 16 December 1971 in Ardooie) is a former Belgian cyclist. He was forced to retire in 2000 because of heart problems.

Palmarès
1993
1st Zellik–Galmaarden
1997
1st GP Briek Schotte
2nd Nokere Koerse
5th E3 Prijs Vlaanderen
1998
5th Nokere Koerse
1999
9th Omloop Het Volk

References

1971 births
Living people
Belgian male cyclists
People from Ardooie
Cyclists from West Flanders